Ivory Coast (Côte d'Ivoire) leads the world in production and export of the cocoa beans used in the manufacture of chocolate, supplying 38% of cocoa produced in the world. West Africa collectively supplies two thirds of the world's cocoa crop, with Ivory Coast leading production at 1.8 million tonnes , and nearby Ghana, Nigeria, Cameroon and Togo producing additional 1.55 million tonnes.  Ivory Coast overtook Ghana as the world's leading producer of cocoa beans in 1978, and today is highly dependent on the crop, which accounts for 40% of national export income. The primary non-African competitor of Ivory Coast is Indonesia, which went from having almost nonexistent domestic cocoa industry in the 1970s to becoming one of the largest producers in the market by the early 2000s. According to the UN FAO, Indonesia overtook Ghana and became the second-largest producer worldwide in 2006. (World Cocoa Foundation provides significantly lower figures for Indonesia, but concurs that it is the largest producer of cocoa beans outside West Africa.) Large chocolate producers such as Cadbury, Hershey's, and Nestle buy Ivorian cocoa futures and options through Euronext whereby world prices are set.

Tree

Theobroma cacao is shade-loving tree native to the understory of rainforests, growing at low elevation in the foothills of the Andes, and the great South American equatorial river basins the Amazon River Basin, and the Orinoco River Basin. The tree is a choice crop for areas of Zulu with low to slight elevations, good soils, and the constant humidity of the tropics.

Farming and Production

The crop is grown in Ivory Coast mostly by smallholder farmers planting on 1–3 hectares. The pods containing the beans are harvested when a sufficient number are ripe, opened to separate the seeds and pulp from the outer rind, and the seeds and pulp are usually allowed to ferment somewhere on the farm, before the seeds are dried in a central location. The dried seeds are purchased by a traitant or buyer who travels among villages in an area to weigh, purchase and collect the crop. The traitant then takes the crop to a short-holding warehouse in a major town or city where the major exporters purchase the seeds and arrange for its export from Ivory Coast. 

The entire process requires the labored contribution of a variety of workers, from the farmer who owns the fields, to their laborers who may be family members (in most cases), to others in the village who harvest pods to ferment seeds at the same time, to the local buyers, and the middlemen between these purchasers and the exporters who finally get the crop to an export ship.

With some two million children involved in the farming of cocoa in West Africa, primarily Ghana and Ivory Coast, child slavery and trafficking were major concerns in 2018. However, international attempts to improve conditions for children were failing because of persistent poverty, absence of schools, increasing world cocoa demand, more intensive farming of cocoa, and continued exploitation of child labor.

Child labour in cocoa production

Ivory Coast and other West African cocoa producing nations have come under severe criticism in the west for using child slave labor to produce the cocoa purchased by Western chocolate companies.  The bulk of the criticism has been directed towards practices in Ivory Coast. The report "A Taste of Slavery: How Your Chocolate May be Tainted" claims that traffickers promise paid work, housing, and education to children who are then forced to labour and undergo severe abuse, that some children are held forcibly on farms and work up to 100 hours per week, and that attempted escapees are beaten.  A BBC article claimed that 15,000 children from Mali, some under age 11, were working as slaves in cocoa production in Ivory Coast, and Mali's Save the Children Fund director described "young children carrying 6kg of cocoa sacks so heavy that they have wounds all over their shoulders."  In 2001 Chocolate Manufacturers Association acknowledged that slaves harvested some cocoa.

In 2013, the U.S. Department of Labor's report Findings on the Worst Forms of Child Labor in Côte d'Ivoire stated that 39.8% of children aged 5 to 14 are working children and that they "are engaged in the worst forms of child labor in agriculture, particularly on cocoa farms, sometimes under conditions of forced labor." In December 2014, the DOL's List of Goods Produced by Child Labor or Forced Labor mentioned Ivory Coast among the countries where instances of such working conditions (both child labor and forced labor) are still observed.

A major study of the issue in 2016, published in Fortune in the U.S., concluded that approximately 2.1 million children in various countries of West Africa "still do the dangerous and physically taxing work of harvesting cocoa". The report was doubtful as to whether the situation can be improved. 

"According to the 2015 edition of the Cocoa Barometer, a biennial report examining the economics of cocoa that's published by a consortium of nonprofits, the average farmer in Ghana in the 2013–14 growing season made just 84¢ per day, and farmers in Ivory Coast a mere 50¢. That puts them well below the World Bank's new $1.90 per day standard for extreme poverty, even if you factor in the 13% rise in the price of cocoa last year. And in that context the challenge of eradicating child labor feels immense, and the chocolate companies' newfound commitment to expanding the investments in cocoa communities not quite sufficient. ... 
'Best-case scenario, we're only doing 10% of what's needed.' Getting that other 90% won't be easy. 'It's such a colossal issue,' says Sona Ebai, the former secretary general of the Alliance of Cocoa Producing Countries. 'I think child labor cannot be just the responsibility of industry to solve. I think it's the proverbial all-hands-on-deck: government, civil society, the private sector. And there, you really need leadership.'"

In April 2018, the Cocoa Barometer 2018 report on the $100-billion industry, said this about the child labor situation in West Africa: "Not a single company or government is anywhere near reaching the sectorwide objective of the elimination of child labour, and not even near their commitments of a 70% reduction of child labour by 2020". A report later that year by New Food Economy stated that the Child Labour Monitoring and Remediation Systems implemented by the International Cocoa Initiative and its partners has been useful, but "they are currently reaching less than 20 percent of the over two million children impacted".

Impacts on Environment 
According to the EU and Ivorian Forestry Ministry, over 80% of the Ivory Coast's forests have disappeared between 1960 and 2010. Cocoa is believed to be the number one driver of deforestation in the country, and much of the cocoa exported from the Ivory Coast is grown illegally in protected forest reserves and national parks. Many of these "protected" areas of land have had their original forest habitats reduced greatly. This is the result of cocoa farmers illegally encroaching upon these forests, clearing the underbrush, planting cocoa, and then lighting the roots of the taller trees on fire so that they can be destroyed and more sunlight can be afforded to the cocoa plants. Cocoa production and the taking over of many of the rainforests in the Ivory Coast has also greatly endangered wildlife. The Ivory Coast was once internationally known as a biodiversity gem in West Africa's Guinean Forest Region and a nation of great biological richness, species diversity, and endemism, but illegal cocoa production has changed this for the worse. Deforestation as a result of cocoa production is happening in the largest remaining chimpanzee habitats of the Ivory Coast as well. Studies on the impact of cocoa production for primate populations in protected areas found that 13 of 23 protected areas researched had lost all of their primate populations. 

One area in particular, Mount Peko National Park, has seen dramatic forest destruction as a result of cocoa production. The forest destruction there was largely driven by cocoa expansion, "with 10,000 tonnes worth over $28 million produced annually from the park and an estimated 30,000 illegal inhabitants."

Regulation 
The states of Côte d'Ivoire and Ghana have founded a cocoa cartel, widely dubbed COPEC.

Pests
Cacao swollen shoot virus
Phytophthora megakarya

References

Agriculture in Ivory Coast
Cocoa production
Chocolate industry